Dazzie Dee is an American West Coast hip hop rapper and record producer who has collaborated and affiliated with artists such as Suga Free, Mausberg, DJ Quik, Ice Cube, Shade Sheist, K-Dee, Kool G Rap, Coolio, Mixmaster Spade, Yo-Yo, Da Lench Mob, and many more. He released two solo albums in 1996, Where's My Receipt? and The Re-Birth, with the most known singles "Knee Deep", "Everybody Wants To Be A Gangsta", and "Where You From?".

Early life

Career

Lidell Williams was born on November 30, Los Angeles, California. He attended and graduated from Washington Preparatory High School in 1989. At 14 Williams met Dr. Dre, Sir Jinx and K-Dee. He's been a gang member of 107th Street UG/BC Crips set, according to Sheppard, member of Skool Boyz. His first EP Turn It Loose was produced by Dr. Dre and Sir Jinx. He was one of the original members of the Lench Mob records, which it was formed by Ice Cube. Due to artistic differences, he left the label to record his first solo album Where's My Receipt released on Capitol Records in 1995. Then he made a re-issue for the album as The Re-Birth on Raging Bull Records in 1996. It was produced by DJ Battlecat and had guest appearances from Ice Cube, Coolio, K-Dee and Tha Chill from Compton's Most Wanted. It's considered by many as a West Coast classic.

With the Lench Mob
Dazzie Dee (formerly known as Big "Saccs"), is a G-funk rapper and an original former member of the legendary West Coast record label Lench Mob along with Ice Cube, K-Dee, J-Dee, Yo-Yo, Chilly Chill, T-Bone, Shorty and more. Due to artistic differences, he left the label to record his first solo album Where's My Receipt released on Capitol Records in 1995. Then he made a re-issue for the album as The Re-Birth on Raging Bull Records in 1996.

Dazzie Dee productions

 Studio albums, EPs
 1988: Turn It Loose EP
 1989: Dazzie Dee
 1995: Where's My Receipt
 1996: The Re-Birth
 2012: The 7th Letter
 2014: Loc’stradamus
 2022: BAKING SODA

 Singles
 1995: "Everybody Wants To Be A Gangsta"
 1996: "Knee Deep"
 1996: "Where You From?"
 2014: "Who'z Down Wit Me"

 Appearance(s)
 1991: Yo-Yo – Make Way for the Motherlode
 1992: Kool G Rap & D.J. Polo – Live And Let Die
 1994: Str8-G – Shadow of a G
 1996: NU City Mass Choir – God Is Able
 2001: Sqeek Da Primadonna – PMS
 2004: XL Middleton – Music 4 A Drunken Evening
 2012: Big Sono – Left Overz EP
 2012: Sisma X – Step Back
 2013: CartelSons – Drugstore Music
 2013: Shade Sheist – BLACKOPS EP
 2014: CartelSons – Solo But Not Alone
 2014: El Don – Prototype
 2014: Westcoast Stone – My Anthology

 Collaborations
 1996 : Killafornia Organization – Killafornia Organization

 Productions
 1994: Str8-G – Shadow of a G
 2000: Mausberg – Non-Fiction
 2000: Mausberg & Suga Free – The Konnectid Project, Vol. 1
 2004: Suga Free – The New Testament (The Truth)
 2005: The Frontlinerz – Gangstream Vol. 1 
 2006: Suga Free – Just Add Water
 2008: Various Artists – Hustle Hard – The All Star Movie Soundtrack
 2011: Suga Free – Why U Still Bullshittin: The Best of Suga Free (as Big Saccs)
 2013: DJ Nik Bean Presents: Bangloose – Sonically Correct
 2014: Dazzie Dee – Who'z Down Wit Me

 Technical, Mixes
 1997: Spice 1 – The Black Bossalini (aka Dr. Bomb From Da Bay)
 2004: Various Artists – West Coast Unified
 2001: DJ Filthy Mela – Summer Drama

 Compilation(s)
 1997: Various Artists – Raging Bull
 1997: Various Artists – Phat Vibes – Rap & Hip Hop Only
 1997: Various Artists – Essentiellement Rap
 1997: Various Artists – Into The Groove Volume 2
 1997: Various Artists – Hip Hop Unlimited
 1997: Various Artists – Gangsta Hip Hop, Vol. 5
 1999: Various Artists – Slice Presents... The Takeover
 2004: Various Artists – Mob Life Presents: On The Grind, Mixtape Vol. 1
 2012: Various Artists – Cocktails 4
 2013: Docc Free – Doccstalized
 2013: Various Artists – G-Funk Rezzurrection

Videography

 Dazzie Dee (as Big Saccs) – "West Coast History 101"
 J-Dee, Dazzie Dee & MC Eiht – "Classic Westcoast Freestyle '93"
 Dazzie Dee (Feat. Tha Chill & Coolio) – "On My Cide"
 Dazzie Dee – "Everybody Wants To Be A Gangsta"
 Dazzie Dee – "About Dat Life"
 Dazzie Dee (Feat. K-Dee) – "All Da Time"
 Suga Free – "Thinkin"

Notes
The Killafornia Organization was a Hip hop supergroup that consisted of South Central Cartel, Compton's Most Wanted, Bonaphyde, Dazzie Dee, Killa, Tray Deee, Hard Times & Wize Guyz. Their debut album, Killafornia Organization, was released in 1996 by Killa Cali Records, Thug Records and produced by 3 Strikes Prod.

See also
 Lench Mob Records
 K-Dee

References

External links
 
 Dazzie Dee at AllMusic
 

Living people
African-American male rappers
African-American record producers
Record producers from California
Rappers from Los Angeles
African-American songwriters
Songwriters from California
West Coast hip hop
Crips
West Coast hip hop musicians
G-funk artists
Gangsta rappers
21st-century American rappers
21st-century American male musicians
1971 births
21st-century African-American musicians
20th-century African-American people
American male songwriters